Alfred Smith (1880 – 1957) was an English footballer who played in the Football League for Stoke.

Career
Smith Initially signed for Stoke from Burton United in 1904, he made his League debut against Nottingham Forest in March 1904 but however he failed to impress the management team and left for Wrexham. Four years later, after serving with Crewe Alexandra he returned to the Victoria Ground, a much wiser and experienced footballer. In the 1910–11 season Smith scored an impressive 35 goals in 44 games for Stoke. Whilst he struggled to reach them highs in the following two seasons and scored 16 goals in 1913–14 and left Stoke after the 1914–15 season. He scored 72 goals for Stoke in all competitions making him one of Stoke most prolific goal scorers. He later took up cricket and became vice captain of Longton Cricket Club.

Career statistics

References

English footballers
Crewe Alexandra F.C. players
Stoke City F.C. players
Wrexham A.F.C. players
English Football League players
1880 births
1957 deaths
Association football inside forwards
Date of birth missing
Date of death missing
Burton United F.C. players